The 1979 SCCA/CART Indy Car Series was the inaugural season for the CART Indy car series. It was the first national championship season of American open wheel racing sanctioned by CART. The season consisted of 14 races. Rick Mears was the national champion, and the rookie of the year was Bill Alsup. The 1979 Indianapolis 500 was sanctioned by USAC, but counted towards the CART points championship. Rick Mears won the Indy 500, his first of four victories in the event.

The 1979 season was filled with controversy on and off the track. During the offseason, several Indy car owners broke off from USAC, and formed Championship Auto Racing Teams, a new sanctioning body to govern the sport of open wheel Indy car racing. USAC continued to sanction their Gold Crown Championship, resulting in two parallel national championships for 1979. The controversy over the first "split" in Indy car racing came to its first climax at the 1979 Indianapolis 500, when USAC rejected entries by certain CART owners. The owners won a court injunction to be allowed to race, and later, another controversy erupted, this time involving illegal wastegate exhaust pipes.

The 1979 CART season was held through an arrangement such that it fell under the sanctioning umbrella of SCCA. This one-year, temporary arrangement was such that it would be formally recognized by ACCUS.

With three wins, two poles, and 14 top tens (no finish worse than 7th), Rick Mears ran away with the inaugural CART championship title. Mears took a large points lead after winning the Indy 500, and never relinquished the top spot through the remainder of the season. Bobby Unser won six races, and finished second in points.

USAC/CART "Split"
For more information, see 1979 Indianapolis 500 § Controversies

Confirmed entries 
The following teams and drivers competed for the 1979 CART World Series.

Season Summary

Schedule 

The California 500 at Ontario Motor Speedway was originally scheduled as a USAC race for September 2, but was switched mid-season to a CART series race. Additional races at Mosport and Rockingham were ultimately cancelled.

 Oval/Speedway  Dedicated road course

Race summaries

Race 1: Arizona Republic/Jimmy Bryan 150

See main article.

Races 2 and 3: Gould Twin Dixie 125's

See main article.

Race 4: Indianapolis 500

See main article.

Races 5 and 6: Trenton Twin Indy

See main article.

Races 7 and 8: Norton Twin 125s

In the first race, Bobby Unser won the pole, followed by Al Unser, Gordon Johncock, Wally Dallenbach, and Rick Mears. Johncock jumped out to lead the first three laps, but Bobby Unser fought back and led until the first caution flew on lap 11 for Spike Gehlhausen's stalled car. Lee Kunzman stayed out under the caution and took the lead, while Bobby Unser's engine blew on lap 21.  Al Unser would pick up the lead after the caution flew for Danny Ongais spinning, but he miscalculated fuel mileage and ran out of fuel with 17 laps to go. This allowed Gordon Johncock to take the lead and win. Mike Mosley finished second, Johnny Rutherford third, Rick Mears fourth and Wally Dallenbach fifth. 11 laps into the race, Tom Sneva encountered a fire in his pits, but no one was hurt.

Before the second race, Bobby Unser's crew installed a new engine.  Mike Mosley led the first lap, but he had fuel pump problems the next lap and dropped out. Throughout the next 25 laps, Johnny Rutherford and Rick Mears would trade the lead, before Unser charged to the front on lap 28 and never looked back, winning the race. Rick Mears finished second on track, but he was penalized for passing cars under the yellow, dropping him to fifth.  Tom Sneva moved to second, Al Unser to third, and Gordon Johncock to fourth. Two cautions flew, the first for John Mahler's stalled car on lap 23 and the second for a crash involving Danny Ongais on lap 40.

Following the second of the two races, Rick Mears was leading the points with a 460 point lead over Gordon Johncock. Bobby Unser was third, 470 points back, Johnny Rutherford fourth, 925 points back, and Mike Mosley rounded out the top 5, 960 points back.

Race 9: Kent Oil 150

Al Unser won the pole, with Bobby Unser, Danny Ongais, Rick Mears and Gordon Johncock making up the rest of the top five. In the race, Al and Bobby Unser dominated, the two brothers being the only ones to lead laps throughout the day. Bobby Unser took the lead for good after Al had transmission problems on lap 48, and led the rest of the race to win over Rick Mears. Gordon Johncock finished third, Danny Ongais fourth, and Al Unser fell to fifth.

With his win, Bobby Unser rose to second in points, 410 points behind Rick Mears. Gordon Johncock fell to third, 490 points back, Johnny Rutherford was in fourth, 1157 points back after dropping out with a blown engine, and Mike Mosley remained in fifth, falling to 1185 points behind after dropping out with a broken gearbox.

Race 10: Ditzler 150

Bobby Unser won the pole, with Gordon Johncock, Tom Sneva, Danny Ongais, and Rick Mears making up the rest of the top five. 

The race was postponed over a week due to rain. When the race did run, except for one lap led by Bill Alsup, Unser, Sneva, and Mears were the only ones to lead the race. Bobby Unser led the first 20 laps, before giving the lead to Mears. Tom Sneva then led at lap 57, followed by Unser regaining the lead on lap 69. Unser made a pit stop with 14 laps to go, giving the lead back to Sneva.  Rick Mears gambled on pit strategy,  and passed Tom Sneva with just 3 laps to go to win the final ever IndyCar race at Trenton. Bobby Unser also passed him, taking advantage of Sneva's fading tires to finish second.  Sneva fell to third, Wally Dallenbach finished fourth after running as high as second before an extended pit stop, and Johnny Rutherford finished fifth. Two cautions slowed the race, both for crashes. One was by Gordon Johncock on lap 5, and the other by Mike Mosley on lap 36.

Rick Mears extended his point lead to 470 points over Bobby Unser. Gordon Johncock remained in third, 782 points back, Johnny Rutherford stayed in fourth, 1307 points back, and Al Unser rose to fifth in points, 1450 points behind.

Race 11: California 500

Rick Mears qualified on the pole, followed by Al Unser, Bobby Unser, Mario Andretti, in a one-off appearance for Penske, and Tom Sneva.

In the race, Al Unser led most of the first half of the race, but lost three laps due to a broken front-spoiler bracket. For the remainder of the race, Bobby Unser and Rick Mears traded the lead, While leading on lap 164, Rick Mears killed the engine on his pit stop, causing him to lose 12 seconds to Bobby Unser. This allowed Unser to lead most of the remaining laps, and won over Rick Mears. Mario Andretti claimed third despite running out of gas at the end, Johnny Rutherford finished fourth, and Al Unser ended up in fifth.

His win allowed Unser to close up to 270 points behind Mears, with Johnny Rutherford rising to third in points, Gordon Johncock falling to fourth, and Al Unser remaining in fifth. Apart from Unser, all other drivers were mathematically eliminated from the championship.

Race 12: Gould Grand Prix

Bobby Unser claimed the pole, his fourth of the season, with Rick Mears starting second, Gordon Johncock starting third, Johnny Rutherford starting fourth, and Al Unser rounding out the top five.

In the race, Gordon Johncock dominated the early stages of the race, before his engine blew while leading on the 36th lap.  This allowed Bobby Unser to take the lead, and hold it the rest of the way to win over Tom Sneva. Rick Mears was third despite running out of gas on the final lap, Johnny Rutherford finished fourth, and Tom Bagley was fifth. The win was the fifth straight for Team Penske.

Bobby Unser was now just 180 points behind Mears in the fight, followed by Rutherford, Johncock, and Al Unser.

Race 13: Rich's Atlanta Classic

Bobby Unser claimed his fifth pole of the year, followed by Rick Mears, Al Unser, Danny Ongais, and Johnny Rutherford.

In the race, Unser dominated the first half of the race, but while leading on lap 55 suffered a blown tire handing the lead to Johnny Rutherford. But with 25 laps remaining in the race, Rutherford's engine blew, which allowed Rick Mears to cruise to an easy victory. Gordon Johncock placed second, despite running out of gas on the final lap, Bobby Unser wound up third, Wally Dallenbach finished fourth, and Al Unser, who had tire problems of his own, finished fifth. The win was Penske's sixth straight.

The win gave Rick Mears a near-insurmountable 270 point lead in the points, which meant that he would win the championship as long as he finished 11th or better in the final round.

Race 14: Miller High Life 150

For the last race of the year, Bobby Unser won another pole, his sixth of the year. Al Unser started second, Wally Dallenbach in third, Rick Mears in fourth, and Tom Sneva in fifth.

In the race, Al Unser jumped out to the lead on the first lap. He would eventually dominate the race, leading 138 of the 150 laps and only giving up the lead for a pair of pit stops.  There were two late-race cautions, one when Wally Dallenbach spun with 9 laps to go, and one when Pancho Carter lost a wheel, which led to a two-lap shootout but Unser pulled away en route to his first and only win of the year, snapping a six-race Penske streak. Bobby Unser claimed second, Rick Mears third, Gordon Johncock fourth, and Tom Sneva fifth.

Mears's third was enough for him to claim the inaugural CART championship, winning by 240 points over Bobby Unser. Gordon Johncock finished third in points, with Johnny Rutherford in fourth and Al Unser in fifth.

Race results 

 CART was sanctioned by the Sports Car Club of America (SCCA)
 Indianapolis was USAC-sanctioned but counted towards the CART championship.

Final driver standings

Driver breakdown

References

See also 
 1979 Indianapolis 500
 1979 USAC Championship Car season

Footnotes

References

Champ Car seasons
 
SCCA/CART